Diego Rodríguez Fernández (born 20 April 1960), known simply as Diego, is a Spanish retired professional footballer who played as a central defender.

In a professional career that spanned more than two decades, he played for both Seville clubs, Betis and Sevilla, appearing in a total of 450 La Liga matches.

Club career
Diego was born in La Orotava, Tenerife. Having started professionally at local CD Tenerife he signed with Real Betis for the 1982–83 season, going on to play nearly 250 official matches and score four La Liga goals.

After six years, Diego joined Andalusia neighbours Sevilla FC, being an undisputed starter – as well as team captain, which he also was at Betis – almost until his final campaign, 1995–96. His lowest output with the club consisted of 24 games in 1994–95, starting in all his appearances as the side qualified for the UEFA Cup as fifth.

Diego retired professionally in June 1998 at the age of 38, after competing in the Segunda División with Albacete Balompié, but still played well into his 40s with another side in his region of adoption, amateurs Dos Hermanas CF. In early 2002, immediately after quitting football, he began his coaching career, acting as assistant to Alfonso Guzmán at Segunda División B's Ciudad de Murcia but replacing him for the final ten matches of the season.

In 2008, Diego returned to Sevilla, starting with the C team and upgrading the following year to the reserves. His first game in charge of the latter was a 8–0 away loss against Hércules CF for the second tier, and in mid-February 2010 he was dismissed.

International career
Diego earned one cap for the Spain national team, appearing in the second half of a 2–1 friendly loss with Czechoslovakia on 24 February 1988, in Málaga. He was subsequently picked for the squad that appeared at that year's UEFA European Championship.

See also
List of La Liga players (400+ appearances)
List of Real Betis players (+100 appearances)

References

External links

1960 births
Living people
People from Tenerife
Sportspeople from the Province of Santa Cruz de Tenerife
Spanish footballers
Footballers from the Canary Islands
Association football defenders
La Liga players
Segunda División players
Segunda División B players
Tercera División players
CD Tenerife players
Real Betis players
Sevilla FC players
Albacete Balompié players
Atlético Dos Hermanas CF players
Spain youth international footballers
Spain under-21 international footballers
Spain under-23 international footballers
Spain amateur international footballers
Spain international footballers
UEFA Euro 1988 players
Spanish football managers
Segunda División managers
Segunda División B managers
Ciudad de Murcia managers
Sevilla Atlético managers